The Constitution of the Republic of North Ossetia-Alania is the basic law of the North Ossetia-Alania which was adopted by the North Ossetian government on November 12, 1994. It has been amended 12 times since its ratification, with the most recent amendment being ratified on May 10, 2017.

References 

 

Politics of North Ossetia–Alania
1994 documents
Law of Russia
Constitutions and charters of federal subjects of Russia